Elaga Top Junior  is a football club based in Nyanza Lac,Makamba County, Burundi. The team plays in the Burundi Ligue A.
The team was originally known as Top Junior Academy but added Elaga after they were promoted to the top league. The team is sponsored by an agricultural and aquaculture company. The team originally from Kayanza County, will be based in Makamba, practice at Nyanza Lac and play at Nkurunziza Peace Park Complex.

Colours and badge 
Top Junior  colors are white and blue.

Top Junior  badge has the image of a leopard and the silhouette of a man about to kick a ball.

Stadium 
Top Junior play their home matches at Nkurunziza Peace Park Complex.
The stadium has a capacity of 25,000 and is based in Gisenyi in Makamba.

Squad

Management and staff

References 

Football clubs in Burundi
Bujumbura